Poland competed at the 2018 European Athletics Championships in Berlin, Germany, from 6-12 August 2018. A delegation of 86 athletes were sent to represent the country.

Medals

Results
 Men 
 Track and road

Field events

Combined events – Decathlon

Women
 Track and road

Field events

References

European Athletics Championships
2018
Nations at the 2018 European Athletics Championships